Blahovishchenske is a city in Holovanivsk Raion, Kirovohrad Oblast (province) of Ukraine. It hosts the administration of Blahovishchenske urban hromada, one of the hromadas of Ukraine. Population: 

There is a railway station in Blahovishchenske.

History 
It was a settlement in Podolian Governorate of Russian Empire.

A local newspaper is published here since 1935.

City since 1974.

The population as of 1989 was 10648 people.

On 19 May 2016, Verkhovna Rada adopted decision to rename Ulianovka as Blahovishchenske and conform to the law prohibiting names of Communist origin.

Until 18 July 2020, Blahovishchenske was the administrative center of Blahovishchenske Raion. The raion was abolished in July 2020 as part of the administrative reform of Ukraine, which reduced the number of raions of Kirovohrad Oblast to four. The area of Blahovishchenske Raion was merged into Holovanivsk Raion.

Former names
 1924-2016 Ulianovka
 since 2016 Blahovishchenske

References

Cities in Kirovohrad Oblast
Cities of district significance in Ukraine
City name changes in Ukraine
Former Soviet toponymy in Ukraine